Cook County Courthouse may refer to:

 Cook County Courthouse (Georgia), in Adel, Georgia
 Cook County Courthouse (Minnesota), in Grand Marais, Minnesota
 Richard J. Daley Center, the location of the Court of Cook County, Illinois